George Joseph Hall (27 January 1857 – 21 November 1924) was a member of the Queensland Legislative Assembly.

Biography
Hall was born in Theddlethorpe, Lincolnshire, the son of George Hall Snr and was educated at the Theddlethorpe National School. In 1870 he became apprenticed to his father as a carpenter before working as a millwright in Hull. He arrived in Bundaberg on the Renfrewshire in 1882, and spent a short time in Melbourne before returning to Bundaberg. In 1887, after suffering a serious accident, Hall became a building draughtsman. He returned to England in 1897 where he worked as a pattern-maker in London.

On 30 May 1882 Hall married Anna Gertrude Mason in Grimsby and together had four sons and a daughter. He died in London in November 1924.

Public career
Hall was an early member of the Labor movement and was a secretary of the Bundaberg Workers Political Organization. He was also treasurer of the General Labor Union.

When Walter Adams, the member for Bundaberg in the Queensland Legislative Assembly died in 1892, Hall won the resultant by-election. He held the seat for less than a year, losing it at the 1893 Queensland colonial election to the Ministerial candidate, Michael Duffy.

References

Members of the Queensland Legislative Assembly
1857 births
1924 deaths
Australian Labor Party members of the Parliament of Queensland